Kinistino was a former territorial electoral district in Northwest Territories, Canada. The electoral district was mandated to return a single member to the Legislative Assembly of the Northwest Territories from its creation in 1888 until it was abolished when Alberta and Saskatchewan were created in 1905. The district was created as part of the North-West Representation Act when it passed through the Parliament of Canada in 1888.

Members of the Legislative Assembly (MLAs)

Election results

1888 election

1891 election

The 1891 Kinistino election was lowest total vote held in the history of the Northwest Territories Legislature.

1894 election

1898 election

1902 election

References

External links 
Website of the Legislative Assembly of Northwest Territories
An Ordinance To amend Chapter 3 of the Consolidated Ordinances 1898, intituled "An Ordinance respecting Elections", Ordinances of the Northwest Territories 1902 - Adjusted the boundaries of the Kinistino Electoral District

Former electoral districts of Northwest Territories